The Three Pyramids Club is the second solo studio album by British singer Suggs known from second wave ska band Madness. It was released in 1998 and reached no. 82 on the UK album chart in its lone week on the chart.

Reception
NME were unimpressed by the album, rating it 5/10 and commenting that "the music swings drunkenly from the vaudeville cheesiness of "Straight Banana" to the rinky-dink cod-ragtime of "Our Man", with Suggs out front like some Cockney karaoke king."

Evan Cater of AllMusic said the album was "far more ambitious" than Suggs' debut solo album, featuring "buoyantly energetic ska-pop". Cater was critical of "Suggs' regrettable predilection for cheesy female background singers and the eye-rolling stupidity of lyrics like "oh, girl, you got me in a whirl," but despite this noted that the album was "more consistent than the debut, and is not without variety."  The review concluded by stating: "A must-have for Madness collectors, The Three Pyramids Club should also appeal to the new generation of ska fans."

Track listing

 The opening introduction of "On Drifting Sand" has a distinct similarity to Madness' 1979 single "One Step Beyond".

Chart performance

Personnel
 Suggs – vocals
 Steve Lironi – guitars, bass guitar, Jaguar & Hammond organs, piano, loops, vibes, theremin, programming, synthesiser, ARP Odyssey, backing vocals
 Jah Wobble – bass guitar
 Chris Barber – bass guitar, trombone
 Vic Pitt - double bass
 Ged Lynch – drums, percussion
 Guy Davies - organ
 Paul Sealey - banjo
 John Crocker - clarinet
 Andy Ross – saxophone 
 Chris Margary – saxophone 
 Vic Pitt – saxophone
 Rico Rodriguez – trombone
 Matt Coleman – trombone
 Dominic Glover – trumpet
 Kevin Robinson – trumpet
 Neil Yates – trumpet
 Pat Halcox – trumpet
 Nick Feldman – keyboards (1), backing vocals (9)
 Keith Summer – backing vocals (4, 8) 
 Michael Flaherty – backing vocals (4, 8)
 Mike Connaris – backing vocals (4, 8)
 General Levy – vocals (6)
 Cutmaster Swift – scratching (8)
 Sarah Brown – backing vocals (3, 7, 10)
 Simon Gunning – backing vocals (9)
 Levine Andrade – violin (10)
Technical
 Steve Lironi – production, mixing
 James Young – engineering, mixing

References

Suggs (singer) albums
1998 albums
Warner Records albums